Qırmızı Qəsəbə, translated as "Red Town", is a village and municipality in the Quba District of Azerbaijan. As of 2010, it had a population of 3,598, mostly Jews. It is widely believed to be the world's only population centre exclusively made up of Jewish people outside of Israel and the United States, and is likewise considered to be the last surviving .  

Located across the Qudyal river from the city of Quba, it is the principal settlement of Azerbaijan's Caucasus Jewish population; the most widely spoken language in the village is Judeo-Tat.

The names of the municipality in Azerbaijani, Russian, and Hebrew all translate to "Red Town" or "Red Village" supposedly in reference to the red tiles used on the buildings. Other sources attribute the name of Qırmızı Qəsəbə to the protected status that it received during World War II, when its residents were shielded from potential persecution in light of Nazi Germany's invasion of the Soviet Union.

History

Jews in Quba and Azerbaijan
The first Jewish settlement in the area was named "Kulgat" on the left bank of the Gudjalchay, just a few kilometers from present day Qırmızı Qəsəbə. The old gravestones in the Kulgat area and other evidence that had been partially destroyed during the attacks of Nadir Shah in the early 18th century prove that the Jews had lived here.

Jewish town across from Quba
While the highland Jews had been in the area around Quba since at least the 13th century, the formal creation of Krasnaya Sloboda is traced back to the 18th century. In 1742 the Khan of Quba, Huseynali Khan, gave the Jews permission to set up a community free of persecution across the river from the city of Quba. Originally referred to as Yevreyskaya Sloboda "Jewish Settlement", the name was changed to Krasnaya Sloboda "Red Settlement" under Soviet rule.

The massive settlement in the Red Town began in 1731. After the death of Huseynali Khan in 1758, his son Fatali Khan was the ruler of the Quba Khanate. Fatali Khan, highly appreciating the loyalty, wisdom, and industriousness of the Mountain Jews, gave them a great opportunity for engaging in agriculture, gardening, trade, and crafts. Favorable living conditions created for Jews in Quba caused the relocation of Jews from other villages, such as Qusar, Uçgün, Şuduq, Griz, and even from Baku, Iran, Turkey and other places to Quba.

The Jews who moved here had previously lived in nine disparate settlements. Jews from Gilan moved to the settlement in the 1780s. The Gilaki settlement of the Gilani Jews located in the center of the Red settlement. People coming from Baku and Quba lived in the settlement of Mizrahi (Hebrew: "East"). Migration from different locations influenced the diversity of employment. For example, Jews moving from mountainous regions were engaged in various agricultural fields, and people who immigrated from Iran were engaged in trade.

Finally, Mountain Jews who escaped attacks and persecutions joined the shelter of heading Husseynanli Khan in Quba. The Quba Khanate, in development during the rule of Hussein Khan (1722–1758) and his son Fatali Khan (1758–1789), consist of the northern lands of Azerbaijan and southern Dagestan, from Derbent to Lankaran. Since 1722, Mountain Jews have settled in the territory of Gudyalchay.

Among Russian Jews, the town once was known as "little Jerusalem".

The town has had an influx of financial support from relatives living in Israel and features a new synagogue, the Bet Knesset. However, after Azerbaijan's independence in 1991, many residents emigrated to Israel, the United States, and Europe, and the population dropped from the roughly 18,000 that lived there during the communist era.

Demographics 
Initially spread throughout the mountainous region, the Jewish population of the highlands became centered around Quba. 

In 1881, 213,138 Jewish people were officially registered in 34 settlements of the Caucasus. Over the past hundred years, along with Mountain Jews, Jews from other ethnolinguistic groups or such defined by their region of origin also lived in Azerbaijan: Ashkenazi Jews, Krymchaks, Kurdish Jews, and Georgian Jews. However, since the 19th century, the majority of the Jewish population of the republic consists of Mountain Jews.

Jewish religious practices 
Two synagogues exist in Qırmızı Qəsəbə: the Six Dome Synagogue which was built in 1888 and renovated in 2000, and "Giləki" (Hilaki) synagogue which was built in 1896 and renovated recently.

Residents speak in three languages: Judeo-Tat, spoken by Mountain Jews in daily life, Russian and Azeri. One of the two schools here is taught in Azeri or Russian.

Notable residents
Yevda Abramov (1948–2019) – politician, member of the Parliament of Azerbaijan
Yakov Agarunov (1907–1992) – was a poet and playwright
Zarakh Iliev (born 1966) – billionaire property developer, born in Krasnaya Sloboda
Yagutil Mishiev (born 1927) – publicist
God Nisanov (born 1972) – billionaire property developer, Vice-President of the World Jewish Congress
German Zakharyayev (born 1971) – businessman, Vice-President of the Russian Jewish Congress
Albert Agarunov – Jewish National Hero of Azerbaijan

See also
History of the Jews in Azerbaijan

References

Notes

Sources

Inga Saffron, "The Mountain Jews of Guba", The Philadelphia Inquirer. July 21, 1997, page 1. Accessed on May 1, 2006
Tom Parfitt, "Life Drains Away from Lost Tribe of Mountain Jews", The Daily Telegraph, April 27, 2003, Accessed on October 21, 2014
Amiram Barkat, "The village people", Haaretz September 29, 2006, Accessed on September 30, 2006

External links

Azerbaijan–Israel relations
Historic Jewish communities in Asia
Historic Jewish communities in Europe
Jewish communities
Jewish enclaves
Jews and Judaism in Azerbaijan
Populated places in Quba District (Azerbaijan)
Shtetls